, also known as , is a trans-Neptunian object from the outermost region of the Solar System, approximately  in diameter. It was first observed on 24 May 2015, by astronomers of the Outer Solar System Origins Survey using the Canada–France–Hawaii Telescope at Mauna Kea Observatories, Hawaii, United States. With an observation arc of 2 years, it is known that it will come to perihelion around August 2022 at a velocity of 6.5 km/s with respect to the Sun.

It is one a small number of detached objects with perihelion distances of 30 AU or more, and semi-major axes of 250 AU or more. Such objects can not reach such orbits without some perturbing object, which lead to the speculation of Planet Nine.

Notes

References

External links 
 
 

Minor planet object articles (unnumbered)
Discoveries by OSSOS
20150524